Lefaucheux-Francotte M. 71 or Revolver m/1871 was a 19th-century Belgian revolver made for Swedish military. It was also the first service revolver of the Principality of Serbia.

Production 
In the second half of the nineteenth century, Auguste Francotte of Liege was one of the largest Belgian arms factories, mostly manufacturing rifles and revolvers for export. Francotte's first breechloading revolver was Model 1865, double action revolver chambered for 11 mm pinfire cartridges, made for the Danish Navy.

Design 
Revolver m/1871 has a Lefaucheux-Francotte double action system with solid frame and fixed cylinder, with no mechanical extractor. Made for Swedish army, it was chambered for 11 mm centerfire cartridges. In 1875, Principality of Serbia bought several thousands of these revolvers for the Serbian military. Revolvers were given to the officers and NCOs of the Serbian National Militia as a sidearm.

Model 1871 was a very similar, but slightly smaller weapon made at the same time for the Danish military, but chambered for 11 mm pinfire cartridges.

See also 

 Green percussion rifle, contemporary Serbian service rifle.

References 

Revolvers of Belgium
Coordinates on Wikidata